The 1920–21 SK Rapid Wien season was the 23rd season in club history.

Squad

Squad and statistics

Squad statistics

Fixtures and results

League

Cup

References

1920-21 Rapid Wien Season
Rapid
Austrian football championship-winning seasons